The Tees Barrage International White Water Course, originally the Teesside White Water Course, is an artificial whitewater course on the north bank of the River Tees, in northern England.
It is part of the Tees Barrage and is located in the Stockton-on-Tees district, accessible by road only from Thornaby-on-Tees and best accessed by the A66.
The course was built in 1995 at a cost of £2 million.
The course is now open once more under the new name TBIWWC (Tees Barrage International White Water Centre).

Facilities 

The course is owned by the Canal & River Trust but administered by Tees Active from the on-site watersports centre.
The white water facility offers kayaking, whitewater slalom, playboating and white water rafting plus surfing on the 'surf wave'.

The centre's facilities include a high ropes course, a placid practice pool; watersports centre, shop and cafe; car parking, camping, picnicking and caravanning areas; bandstand and landscaped amphitheatre, The Talpore pub, a restaurant and hotel.
The course itself is a 'U' shaped loop,
250 m long, 7 m wide with a 3.7 m drop and a flow of 14 cumecs (m3/s).
The immediate environs of the white water course include the Teesdale Way cycle path (National Cycle Network), the River Tees, the Tees Barrage and the placid grade A two star waters of the river Tees; the David Lloyd Leisure racquet centre, a superstore and Portrack Marsh Nature Reserve.

Operation 

The state of the course can depend on the level of the tide in the River Tees.
The course can operate by flow diversion for two or three hours either side of low tide
but can operate at any time when the pumps are used.
The course can operate all year round and in hours of darkness when it is flood-lit, and spot-lit on the two footbridges.

Photo gallery (2008)

Redevelopment 

In 2010 and 2011, a £4.6 million redevelopment of the course was undertaken.
The changes include the addition of a new shorter, steeper course and a canoe lift with disabled paddlers in mind.
Four large 12 m long 3 m diameter Archimedes' screws were installed to pump water from the bottom pool to the top pool guaranteeing water levels for paddlers at all states of the tide.
There are plans to generate electricity from the head of river water above the barrage by putting the Archimedes' screws into reverse when not pumping water around the course, making the course more energy efficient.
These improvements made the site a world class training facility which is proposed as a training camp location for the 2012 Olympic games.
Work started in March 2010 and was completed in October 2011.
Her Majesty Queen Elizabeth II, accompanied by His Royal Highness The Duke of Edinburgh, visited Stockton on 18 July 2012 to officially reopen the International White Water Course as part of their Diamond Jubilee tour of the United Kingdom.

Popular culture
The TBIWWC was used in a segment of the film 1917. In the scene, the actor George MacKay jumps into a river in France and is flung over rapids and a waterfall. These scenes were filmed at the course.
An episode of Emmerdale was filmed at the TBIWWC where the character Victoria Sugden fell down a waterfall.

Note 

The Tees Barrage International White Water Course is not to be confused with The River Tees Watersports Centre, Dugdale Street, Stockton-on-Tees 1 km further upriver on the same side near the Princess of Wales Bridge or indeed the Castlegate Quay Water Sports Centre a little further up-river near Teesquay Millennium Bridge.

References 

List of artificial whitewater courses.

External links 

 Official course website
 The Tees Barrage Website
 Articles on: BBC
 Evaluations and reviews on: UK Rivers Guidebook and Playak
 Tide times at nearby Tees Newport Bridge on BBC and Easytide
 Video: YouTube.

Sports venues in County Durham
Artificial whitewater courses in the United Kingdom
Sport in the Borough of Stockton-on-Tees
River Tees